Ziyad Al-Aly is an American physician and clinical epidemiologist who is currently Director of the Clinical Epidemiology Center and Chief of the Research and Development at the Veterans Affairs St. Louis Health Care System. He is also a clinical epidemiologist at Washington University in St. Louis He has led multiple studies on long COVID and its sequelae.

He holds a medical degree from the American University of Beirut. He completed his post-graduate medical education at Saint Louis University and Washington University in Saint Louis.

He has an h-index of 70 according to Google Scholar. Link to his publications.

Long Covid Research 
Al-Aly led work which provided the first systematic characterization of the post-acute sequelae of SARS-CoV-2 infection. He subsequently led work which characterized the increased risks of cardiovascular disease, neurologic disorders, mental health disorders, gastrointestinal disorders, diabetes, dyslipidemia, and kidney disease following SARS-CoV-2 infection. His lab also produced evidence characterizing the effects of COVID-19 vaccines on Long Covid and the health consequences of repeated infections with SARS-CoV-2.

References

Year of birth missing (living people)
Living people
American University of Beirut alumni
American epidemiologists
Washington University School of Medicine faculty
Washington University in St. Louis fellows
21st-century American scientists
21st-century American physicians